The A6 motorway is a motorway in the Netherlands. It is just over 100 kilometers in length and it connects the A1 motorway at interchange Muiderberg with the A7 motorway at interchange Joure.

Overview
Just after its start at interchange Muiderberg and the first exit, the A6 motorway crosses the bridge Hollandsebrug. Next, it passes the city of Almere, which has a total of six exits and an interchange (interchange Almere to the A27 motorway). Further to the northeast, just after Lelystad, the road crosses the Ketelbrug bridge to the Noordoostpolder and connects to highway N50 at the interchange Emmeloord. After this interchange, the road goes north to the city of Joure, where it connects to the A7 motorway using a semi-directional T interchange.

The A6 motorway, of which the largest part is located in the province of Flevoland, is the shortest route between the city of Amsterdam and most parts of the northern provinces of Friesland and Groningen.

Hollandsebrug 

In April 2007, it was announced that the bridge Hollandsebrug, the bridge between intersection Muiderberg and the city of Almere, did not meet the quality and safety standards. The Dutch research organization TNO found out that heavy trucks could cause holes to appear in the road surface. Therefore, as of April 27 of that year, heavy traffic was not allowed to cross the bridge in either direction, and was forced to use the A1 and A27 motorways instead, a detour of about 20 kilometers.

Exit list

External links

Motorways in the Netherlands
Motorways in Flevoland
Motorways in Friesland
Motorways in North Holland